A company man in the petroleum industry refers to a representative of an operating/exploration company. Other terms that may be used are company representative, foreman, drill site supervisor (DSV), company consultant, rigsite leader or "well site manager".

In a normal scenario, gas/oil-drilling (exploration) companies rent or lease the rigs from another company that owns the rig, the drilling contractor.  The majority of the personnel on the drilling rig, called 'the rig crew', are employees of the drilling contractor.  The company man is the on-site representative of the operating/exploration company and is in overall charge of the drilling and associated activities.  Rig operations and maintenance and crew upkeep are attended to by the toolpusher, who works for the drilling contractor.

Expertise
A company man is not a supervisor in the traditional sense.  He/she is representing the oil company that is paying for the well amongst other companies performing the services. In matters where safety may be questioned the oil rig workers, who probably aren't employed by the same company as the company man, may refuse to perform an action requested by the company man. In recent years it has become standard safety policy that anyone can "Stop the Job" if they feel there is a hazard that has not been properly addressed. This can be found in most contractor safety manuals and is generally encouraged by the drilling company also. 

The company man is knowledgeable in the area of drilling operations and to some extent completion operations.  He/she is not generally responsible for defining the technical aspects of the well, but instead works with a team of office-based engineers and geologists and is the team member responsible for carrying out the written drilling program in an efficient and safe fashion. Since most of the physical work is carried out by contractors that may have separate interests from the oil company, the company man is often the sole representative of the oil company on location to ensure that plans are carried out according to specifications, time-lines and budgets. The company man usually gives orders only to the supervisor(s) of the drilling contractor and various service companies, lest he/she run the risk of violating the "Independent Contractor" concept and possibly incurring additional liability (e.g., for personnel injuries) for his/her own company.

In the modern era, many company men have a degree in petroleum engineering or some other discipline of engineering with broad experience in a variety of oilfield jobs.  However, many others have some of the skills of a drilling engineer but without a degree, and have worked their way from being a "worm" manual laborer to the position of highest authority on the drilling site, similar to a private working to the position of general through a demonstration of competence. The next step for a company man is to become a specialist "floating foreman," who is skilled at solving complex drilling problems, or to become a "rig superintendent" who may oversee many rigs and have company men as direct reports.  From there it is possible for some to move on to upper management in an oil company, or to branch off into a multitude of other careers requiring technical management experience.

Usually, 24-hour supervision is required at the well site. To achieve this, a night company man may be utilized.

Alternative meanings
"Company man" also is a term relating to a "yes-man", or someone who will do anything demanded of them by those who are supervising them: that is, someone whose primary allegiance is to the company rather than colleagues or friends.

In modern times the term has also been used to describe as a man that has one or more sexual partners in an office or work environment.  It is often used a badge of honor among 'City Boys' within the UK.

See also
 Glossary of oilfield jargon

Resource extraction occupations
Petroleum production